The men's javelin throw event at the 2000 World Junior Championships in Athletics was held in Santiago, Chile, at Estadio Nacional Julio Martínez Prádanos on 21 and 22 October.

Medalists

Results

Final
22 October

Qualifications
21 October

Group A

Group B

Participation
According to an unofficial count, 33 athletes from 25 countries participated in the event.

References

Javelin throw
Javelin throw at the World Athletics U20 Championships